Plainwell High School is a high school located in Plainwell, Michigan. Approximately 200 students graduate from Plainwell High School per year. The school is in a suburban school district just outside Kalamazoo, Michigan and is located in Allegan County. The school's motto is: "Preparing students for success through academic excellence and strength of character."

References

School website
Plainwell Trojans historical football scores

Public high schools in Michigan
Schools in Allegan County, Michigan